Hongneung Arboretum (Hangul:홍릉수목원 Hanja) is an arboretum in Dongdaemun-gu, Seoul, served by Seoul Subway Line 6. The grounds are freely open to the public on weekend, but picnics are not allowed.

External links

 (Korean)

Dongdaemun District
Tourist attractions in Seoul